Ma. Leticia J. Pascual Ladlad, known by her nickname "Tish," (disappeared November 1, 1975) was a student journalist at the University of the Philippines Los Baños (UPLB) during the Marcos dictatorship, known for being the first woman editor-in-chief of the Aggie Green and Gold, for her community organizing work among farmers in Laguna and Quezon, and for being the first UPLB student to become a desaparecido during the Martial Law regime.

She is honored as a martyr of the Philippines' Martial Law era, having had her name etched on the wall of remembrance at the Philippines' Bantayog ng mga Bayani. In UPLB, she is honored at the campus' Hagdan ng Malayang Kamalayan memorial.

See also 
 List of people who disappeared
 Extrajudicial killings and forced disappearances in the Philippines

References 

1970s missing person cases
20th-century Filipino women
Enforced disappearances in the Philippines
History of the Philippines (1965–1986)
Individuals honored at the Bantayog ng mga Bayani
Marcos martial law victims
Martial law under Ferdinand Marcos
Missing person cases in the Philippines
Political repression in the Philippines
University of the Philippines Los Baños people honored at the Bantayog ng mga Bayani
1950 births
Living people